Woodland is an unincorporated community in Jackson Township, Union County, Ohio, United States.

History
Woodland had its start in the 1860s when a store and planing mill were built there. A post office was established at Woodland in 1869, and remained in operation until 1907.

References

Unincorporated communities in Union County, Ohio
Unincorporated communities in Ohio